United Kingdom Land Forces was a command of the British Army responsible for generating and preparing forces for current and contingency operations.  The commander of the forces was known as Commander-in-Chief, United Kingdom Land Forces, who in turn reported to the Chief of the General Staff.

On 1 April 1972, HQ Army Strategic Command amalgamated with the three existing geographical commands (Northern Command, Southern Command and Western Command) to form HQ UK Land Forces. It had eight districts plus HQ Scotland and HQ Northern Ireland under its direction:

 London District (HQ in London)
 Eastern District (HQ at Colchester)
 South Eastern District (HQ at Aldershot) (a reformation of a headquarters disbanded in 1903)
 South West District (HQ at Bulford Camp)
 North West District (HQ at Cuerden Hall near Bamber Bridge)
 West Midlands District (HQ at Shrewsbury)
 Headquarters Wales (HQ at Brecon)
 North East District (HQ in York)
 Headquarters Scotland (HQ in Edinburgh)
 Headquarters Northern Ireland (HQ at Lisburn).

North West District headquarters shifted to Fulwood Barracks, Preston, in 1977. In the early 1980s West Midlands District became HQ Western District.

In 1995, HQ UK Land Forces at Wilton assumed control of troops in Germany and most other places. The remaining British Army troops in Germany (including the core of Headquarters Allied Command Europe Rapid Reaction Corps, HQ ARRC) were placed under its command after the disbandment of Headquarters British Army of the Rhine. It became HQ Land Command, and assumed control of almost all British Army combat and combat support units on 1 April 1995. When it was formed it included 69,200 regular troops (6,400 officers and 62,800 other ranks), 59,700 reservists and 14,200 civil servants.

Commander-in-Chief, United Kingdom Land Forces (1971–1995) 
Holders of the post have been:

 General Sir Basil Eugster 1972–1974
 General Sir Roland Gibbs 1974–1976
 General Sir Edwin Bramall 1976–1978
 General Sir John Archer 1978–1980
 General Sir Timothy Creasey 1980–1981
 General Sir John Stanier 1981–1982
 General Sir Frank Kitson 1982–1985
 General Sir James Glover 1985–1987
 General Sir John Chapple 1987–1988
 General Sir Charles Huxtable 1988–1990
 General Sir John Waters 1990–1993
 General Sir John Wilsey 1993–1995

Footnotes 

Commands of the British Army
Military units and formations established in 1972
Military units and formations disestablished in 1995
Military units and formations established in 2008
Military units and formations disestablished in 2015